Breiter Graben is a canal in Landkreis Görlitz, Saxony, Germany. It is also known as Flutgraben and runs between the north-western edge of the lignite open-cast mine Nochten and the village of Mulkwitz where it joins the river Struga, a tributary of the river Spree. On its course, it passes north of the village Mühlrose. Its acidic, iron-rich water, originating from an open-cast mine, heavily pollutes Struga river.

References

Bodies of water of Saxony
Görlitz (district)